Wilhelm Cornides (20 July 1920 – 15 July 1966) was a Wehrmacht sergeant in World War II, serving in the General Government territory. He was the author of the Cornides Report, which contains his account of the extermination of Jews at Belzec during the Holocaust. In December 1946 Cornides became the founder of Europa-Archiv (renamed Internationale Politik in 1995), the first post-war magazine in Allied-occupied Germany. In 1955 he was instrumental along with Theodor Steltzer, Minister-President of Schleswig Holstein and former member of the dissident Kreisau Circle, in founding the German Council on Foreign Relations (Deutsche Gesellschaft für Auswärtige Politik, DGAP). Through his mother Cäcilie (Cilla) von Oldenbourg, Cornides was a member of the Oldenbourg family, owners of Oldenbourg Verlag publishers; a German publishing house founded in 1858 by Rudolf Oldenbourg.

Holocaust witness

On 30 August 1942, during the occupation of Poland by Nazi Germany, Cornides was in Rzeszów (renamed Reichshof), on his way to the city of Chełm (Cholm) by train. He wrote a private journal to pass the time, recording things he would not want to talk about with anyone else. He wrote what a German railway policeman told him, that the area would soon be free of Jews (Judenfrei), since every day freight trains packed with Jews from the Generalgouvernement passed through the railway yard, and come back in the evening empty and swept clean. The policeman said he had seen 6,000 Jews from Jarosław (Jaroslau) recently killed in one day. Cornides made also several entries about what he had seen himself. His observations surfaced in 1959, typewritten on three letter size sheets. They were published in July 1959 by historian Hans Rothfels in the German quarterly Journal of Contemporary History (Vierteljahrshefte für Zeitgeschichte). By that time, the much more revealing Gerstein Report which featured shocking details about the extermination process at Belzec was already well known in Germany.

Diary entries
Cornides took a regular German passenger train from Rzeszów to Chełm and spoke with the other passengers. He arrived at Rawa Ruska junction around noon on 31 August 1942 and made further entries in his journal later that day.

Cornides lounged at the Deutsches Haus in Rawa Ruska before he boarded the connecting train to Chełm the same evening. In the next hour, he made three separate entries in his diary. The first, written at 5.30 pm, stated that what he had learned was extraordinary.

Belzec camp

In his train compartment, Cornides talked to a German woman who had witnessed the round-up of Jews at Chełm and the shooting of those who tried to escape. The railway policeman said: "In the railway documents these trains run under the name of resettlement transports," and added that after the murder of Reinhard Heydrich by Czech resistance members, several trains filled with Czech Jews had passed through. Camp Belzec was located on the railway line. The woman promised to point it out to Cornides when they passed it. The entry in his diary reads:

 
In his typewritten pages, Cornides also summarized conversations with other Germans he met during his stopover in the Deutsches Haus at Rawa Ruska, as well as statements he remembered from Chełm upon his arrival there.

See also

 Special Prosecution Book-Poland, 1937–1939
 Jäger Report, 1941
 Einsatzgruppen reports, 1941–1942
 Riegner Telegram, 1942
 Höfle Telegram, 1943
 Katzmann Report, 1943
 Korherr Report, 1943
 Gerstein Report, 1945

References

External links
Deportations to Belzec Arad, pp. 383-389 Table with exact dates and numbers (Internet Archive). Retrieved 5 May 2015.
The German Council on Foreign Relations (DGAP) from its beginnings Wayback Machine
International Politik, English version homepage.

1920 births
1966 deaths
German Army soldiers of World War II
Belzec extermination camp
Military personnel from Munich
Place of death missing
Witnesses to The Holocaust